Mahamarakkalage Vinodh Devinda Perera (born 28 October 1989) is a Sri Lankan cricketer. He made his List A debut for Anuradhaura District in the 2016–17 Districts One Day Tournament on 15 March 2017.

References

External links
 

1989 births
Living people
Sri Lankan cricketers
Anuradhaura District cricketers
Bloomfield Cricket and Athletic Club cricketers
Nugegoda Sports and Welfare Club cricketers
Kurunegala Youth Cricket Club cricketers
Sri Lanka Navy Sports Club cricketers
Sri Lanka Schools XI cricketers
People from Negombo